The Rouen Cathedral series was painted in the 1890s by French impressionist Claude Monet. The paintings in the series each capture the façade of the Rouen Cathedral at different times of the day and year and reflect changes in its appearance under different lighting conditions.

Date
The Rouen Cathedral paintings, more than thirty in all, were made in 1892 and 1893 in Rouen, Normandy, then reworked in Monet’s studio in 1894. Monet rented spaces in Rouen across the street from the cathedral as his temporary studio. In 1895 he selected what he considered to be the twenty best paintings from the series for display at his Paris dealer’s gallery and sold eight of them before the exhibition was over. Camille Pissarro and Paul Cézanne visited the exhibition and praised the series highly.

Historically, the series was well-timed. In the early 1890s, France was seeing a revival of interest in Catholicism and the subject of one of its major cathedrals was well received.  Apart from its religious significance, Rouen Cathedral—built in the Gothic style—could be seen as representing all that was best in French history and culture, given that it was a style of architecture that was admired and adopted by many European countries during the Middle Ages.

Painting Light
When Monet painted the Rouen Cathedral series, he had long since been impressed with the way light imparts to a subject a distinctly different character at different times of the day and the year and as atmospheric conditions change. For Monet, the effects of light on a subject became as important as the subject itself. Like his other series (such as the famous Water Lilies) in which Monet painted many views of the same subject under different lighting conditions, these works are an attempt to illustrate the importance of light in our perception of a subject at a given time and place.

Robert Pelfrey, in Art and Mass Media, wrote:

By focusing on the same subject through a whole series of paintings, Monet was able to concentrate on recording visual sensations themselves. The subjects did not change, but the visual sensations – due to changing conditions of light – changed constantly.

The cathedral series was not Monet's first series of paintings of a single subject, but it was his most exhaustive. The subject matter was a change, however, for prior to this series, Monet had painted mostly landscapes. The cathedral allowed him to highlight the paradox between a seemingly permanent, solid structure and the ever-changing light which constantly plays with our perception of it. There were calls for the state to buy the entire series and exhibit them as a whole, but these calls were not heeded and the series was divided.

Technique
Painting the cathedral was a challenging task, even for Monet. Michael Howard, in his Encyclopedia of Impressionism, writes:

As always, the pictures gave him intense difficulties, which threw him into despair. He had vivid nightmares of the cathedral in various colors – pink, blue and yellow – falling upon him… [Monet wrote:] ‘Things don’t advance very steadily, primarily because each day I discover something I hadn’t seen the day before… In the end, I am trying to do the impossible.’

Monet found that the thing he had set out to paint—light—was an almost impossible thing to capture because of its ever-changing nature and its extreme subtlety. He was assisted, however, by his ability to capture the essence of a scene quickly, then finish it later using a sketch combined with his memory of the scene. For these paintings, he used thick layers of richly textured paint, expressive of the intricate nature of the subject. Paul Hayes Tucker, in Claude Monet: Life and Art, writes:

Monet’s sensitivity to the natural effects he observed are just one factor that make these pictures so remarkable; the way he manipulates his medium contributes to their majesty as well. For the surfaces of these canvases are literally encrusted with paint that Monet built up layer upon layer like the masonry of the façade itself.

The subtle interweaving of colors, the keen perception of the artist and the  use of texture all serve to create a series of shimmering images in light and color—masterpieces worthy of the grandeur of their subject matter.

Gallery

Public display
In 1994, the Musée des Beaux-Arts de Rouen exhibited sixteen paintings of the series.

The Musée d'Orsay has five paintings of the series on permanent display.

In 2018, the National Gallery in London exhibited five paintings of the series, together in a single room, for the duration of a temporary exhibition titled Monet & Architecture, devoted to Claude Monet's use of architecture as a means to structure and enliven his art. This was a rare occurrence because no museum other than the Musée d'Orsay owns or exhibits more than three in a permanent collection and none of the museum's examples were included in the exhibition.

The five paintings exhibited were the examples from the following collections:

 National Museum Cardiff
 Klassik Stiftung Weimar
 Museum of Fine Arts
 Beyeler Foundation
 An undisclosed private collection

See also
List of paintings by Claude Monet

References

External links

 

An in-depth analysis of Monet's Rouen series in theartwolf.com
Brief essay on Monet's Rouen Cathedral series from the J. Paul Getty Museum

Paintings by Claude Monet
Series of paintings by Claude Monet
1890s paintings
Religious paintings
Churches in art
Collections of the National Gallery of Art
Paintings in the collection of the J. Paul Getty Museum